Dukot is a 2016 Filipino suspense thriller film directed by Paul Soriano. It stars Enrique Gil, Ricky Davao, Shaina Magdayao, Bing Pimintel and Christopher de Leon. The film is executive produced by Charo Santos-Concio and Malou Santos. Based on true events, the film tells the story of Carlo, played by Enrique, who was kidnapped and held to demand ransom from his parents. It was released by Star Cinema on July 13, 2016 in more than one hundred cinemas throughout the country. The film was Graded B by the Cinema Evaluation Board of the Philippines.

Plot

The film centers on the family of a middle-class government official. The family goes through hell when Carlo (Gil), who is estranged from his father, is kidnapped. Carlo must be rescued, otherwise he will be forced to fight for his life to escape a ruthless gang of ex-military mercenaries. The film revolves around two families that come from two totally different worlds. Uncontrollable circumstances will unleash a chain of events that shall compel these families to do unimaginable things to fight for what they think and feel is right.

Cast

Enrique Gil as Carlo Sandoval
Ricky Davao as Charlie Sandoval
Shaina Magdayao as Cathy Sandoval
Bing Pimentel as Cecille Sandoval 
Ping Medina as Alex
Alex Medina as Jimbo
Bangs Garcia as Girlie
Dino Pastrano as Tiny
Christopher de Leon as Mang Johnny
Candy Pangilinan as Police Chief Dela Vega
Dindo Arroyo as Dr. Herrera

Production
The production of the film took three months while principal photography took 20 days. In an article published by The Philippine Star, director Paul Soriano was quoted to have said that Enrique Gil was his "first and only choice" for the role of Carlo. The two met back in 2011 when Enrique auditioned for a part in Soriano's sports biographical drama film Thelma. However, Enrique did not get the part due to his then difficulty in speaking the Filipino language.

Release
The film was released on July 13, 2016 in over one hundred cinemas nationwide. A premiere night for the film was held on July 12, 2016 at the Dolphy Theater inside the ABS-CBN Studios. It was attended by some of the cast and crew of the film as well as some of the executives of ABS-CBN.

Marketing
The official trailer of the film was released on YouTube on June 29, 2016 followed by extensive TV spots on ABS-CBN, ABS-CBN Sports+Action and on ABS-CBN's cable channels. The "uncut" trailer of the film was released on YouTube on July 13, 2016. A one-minute teaser trailer of the film was released by director Paul Soriano on YouTube displaying the original anamorphic widescreen aspect ratio of the film. A press conference for the film was held on July 5, 2016 that was attended by the director and some of the cast. Prior to the release, director Paul Soriano, actors Enrique Gil, Ricky Davao, and Christopher de Leon were separately invited to the late-night celebrity talk show Tonight with Boy Abunda. Shaina Magdayao was also invited to the show three days after the premiere to promote the film.

Critical reception
Philbert Ortiz Dy of ClickTheCity.com rated the film 3 stars out of 5 and wrote that "all in all, Dukot is a pretty engaging film. From scene to scene, it manages to maintain a certain tone and build up the tension. But it’s all in service of a narrative that doesn’t have any thematic follow-through. The film builds so much moral ambiguity, and there’s so much left to dissect as the film raises the volume on the music and jumps to its conclusion. This is a sharp piece of filmmaking, but what it ends up saying through its abandonment of its complexity is questionable at best." Nazamel Tabares of Movies Philippines rated the film 4 stars out of 5 and wrote that "Dukot might not be as thrilling or as meaty as the themes it tackles, but it is a well-made suspense thriller that doesn’t come often in Philippine cinemas. It lacks power in its narrative even though it hints some every now and then, but the shots are tastefully done and the story is decent enough that you get to feel the tense of the situation and what the characters are going through emotionally. Well, some of it." Rey de la Cruz Jr. of FHM Philippines rated the film 7.5 out of 10 describing the film as "a well-directed suspense thriller about a real-life kidnapping. Nice to see an actor like Enrique Gil finally show off his acting skills." Oggs Cruz of Rappler in a less positive review wrote that "the film’s failure really lies in its misdirected ambitions. It only provokes partially, quickly retreating from its hefty provocations just when the opportunity to get darker and more vicious opens up. Again, it’s all interesting in premise. Everything else is just too safe." Kevin Tan of Film Police Reviews rated the film 3 stars out of 5 and wrote that "Dukot can be commended on injecting fresh ideas into the local mainstream industry, and it shows Soriano’s maturity in his craft. However, the script lacks the guts to deliver a story as dark and gritty as its visuals. Dukot holds back on depicting hostility and violence that could have rendered audiences more upset and unsettled about today’s reality the moment they exit theaters."

Full Cast & Crew
Starring: Enrique Gil, Ricky Davao, Shaina Magdayao, Bing Pimentel, Christopher de Leon, Candy Pangilinan, Bangs Garcia, Ping Medina, Alex Medina, & Dindo Arroyo
Directed by: Paul Soriano
Produced by: Paul Soriano, Charo Santos-Concio, & Malou Santos
Music by: Robbie Factoran & Ricardo Juco
Written by: Mark Victor & Jaqueline Franquelli (as Jaqueline V. Franquelli)
Cinematographered by: Odyssey Flores & Mycko David
Sound by: April Castro (dubbing supervisor), Noel Urbano (dubbing supervisor)
Costume & Wardrobe Department: Adonis Barsuela (wardrobe master - as Adonis N. Berzuela)
Camera & Electrical Department: Ben de Vera (double cameramen), Joel Casaol (master grip)

Awards and nominations

References

External links

Dukot at the Star Cinema website
Dukot is Graded B by the Cinema Evaluation Board
The Making of 'DUKOT' | Enrique Gil
Official Trailer | 'DUKOT' | Enrique Gil
(UNCUT TRAILER) 'DUKOT' | Enrique Gil
(FULL) 'Dukot' Press Conference | Enrique Gil | Star Cinema, TEN17

Star Cinema films
Philippine thriller films
2010s Tagalog-language films
Films about child abduction
Films about families
Films about hostage takings
2016 thriller films
Films directed by Paul Soriano